Newcastle bus routes connect suburbs in and around Newcastle and Lake Macquarie, about 100 kilometres north of Sydney.

Newcastle is the second-largest city in the state of New South Wales, serving as a regional centre for residents of the Central Coast, Hunter Valley and Great Lakes regions. Bus services within Newcastle are operated by Newcastle Transport. It also operates a ferry service across the Hunter River between Newcastle's CBD and Stockton. Hunter Valley Buses also operate many routes in the area. These two main operators have an east–west split, with Newcastle Transport buses mostly covering the inner city and coastal region east of the lake as far south as Swansea, while Hunter Valley Buses cover the region west of the lake, Newcastle Airport, and outlying suburbs and towns, extending into the valley. Port Stephens Coaches serve the airport and coast north of Newcastle.

The network is overseen by Transport for NSW, with the Opal card ticketing system valid for most journeys. Newcastle consists of five outer metropolitan bus regions for the purposes of contracting arrangements (regions OSMBSC 1 to 4 and NISC 1).

Busways, Greyhound Australia, NSW TrainLink, Port Stephens Coaches, Premier Motor Service, Rover Coaches and Sid Fogg's also run intercity routes connecting Newcastle to the rest of New South Wales.

Newcastle Transport

Following Newcastle Transport taking over the operations of Newcastle Buses & Ferries in July 2017, the network was completely redesigned from 14 January 2018.

Areas serviced
Some of the major destinations Newcastle Transport serves include Newcastle Interchange, Queens Wharf, Broadmeadow, The Junction, Mayfield, Waratah, University of Newcastle, Jesmond, Westfield Kotara, Charlestown Square, Lake Macquarie Fair, Wallsend, Stockland Glendale, Warners Bay, Belmont, John Hunter Hospital, Cardiff and Swansea.

Current Routes
10X Newcastle Interchange - Charlestown (weekdays, express)
11 Queens Wharf – Mayfield – University of Newcastle – Jesmond – John Hunter Hospital – Charlestown Square (some services to Jesmond only)
12 Merewether Beach – Newcastle Interchange – Hamilton – Georgetown - Wallsend – Maryland (some services to Wallsend only)
13 Queens Wharf – Broadmeadow – John Hunter Hospital – Cardiff – Glendale
14 Queens Wharf – The Junction – Kotara – Charlestown – Jewells – Belmont – Swansea Heads (some services to Charlestown or Belmont only)
21 Marketown – Queens Wharf – The Junction – Merewether – Broadmeadow
22 Newcastle Interchange – The Junction – Merewether – Charlestown
23 Marketown - Newcastle Interchange – Broadmeadow – Lambton – North Lambton – Jesmond – Wallsend
24 Marketown – Carrington – Mayfield – Waratah – University – Jesmond – Wallsend
25 Broadmeadow – New Lambton – Kotara – Charlestown
26 Marketown - Newcastle Interchange – Broadmeadow – Kotara – John Hunter Hospital – Elermore Vale – Wallsend
27 Broadmeadow – Waratah – University – Shortland – Birmingham Gardens - Wallsend
28 Marketown - Newcastle Interchange – Broadmeadow – Adamstown – Charlestown – Mount Hutton
29 Glendale – Cardiff – Warners Bay – Eleebana – Belmont – Pelican - Swansea North (some services to Belmont only)
41 Mount Hutton – Croudace Bay – Valentine – Belmont
42 Wallsend – Elermore Vale – John Hunter Hospital
43 Mount Hutton – Windale – Tingira Heights – Floraville – Belmont
44 Kotara – Garden Suburb – Cardiff – Glendale - Speers Point - Warners Bay
46 Wallsend – Elemore Vale - Glendale
47 Marketown – Maryville – Mayfield – Warabrook – Sandgate – Shortland – Jesmond
48 Warners Bay – Charlestown – Dudley – Redhead – Jewells – Belmont
55n Queens Wharf – Hamilton – Mayfield North – Kooragang – Fern Bay – Stockton (NightOwl bus service only - no return service)
Late NightOwl services are operated on routes 11, 12, 13, 14 and 55N.

Hunter Valley Buses
136 Stockton – Fern Bay – Newcastle Airport – Medowie – Raymond Terrace
137 Lemon Tree Passage – Salt Ash – Medowie – Raymond Terrace
138 Newcastle Interchange – Salt Ash – Newcastle Airport – Fern Bay – Lemon Tree Passage (weekdays only)
140 Newcastle – Mayfield – Hexham – Tomago – Raymond Terrace
141 Raymond Terrace loop (Monday to Saturday)
145 Newcastle Airport – Raymond Terrace – Beresfield – Stockland Green Hills
177 Rutherford - Budgeree Dr Loop
178 Rutherford - Industrial Estate - Anambah Rd Loop
179 Stockland Green Hills – Maitland – Leconfield - Branxton - North Rothbury (Monday to Saturday)
180 Stockland Green Hills – Maitland – Branxton - Singleton - Singleton (Monday to Saturday)
181 Woodberry – Stockland Green Hills – Maitland – Rutherford – Aberglasslyn
182 Thornton – Ashtonfield – Stockland Green Hills – Maitland – Rutherford
183 Tenambit – Stockland Green Hills – Maitland – Rutherford
184 Morpeth – Tenambit – Stockland Green Hills
185 Maitland – Lorn – Bolwarra – Largs (Limited service extends to Gresford)
186 Rutherford to McKeachie's Run
187 Stockland Greenhills - East Maitland (Monday to Saturday)
188 Stockland Green Hills - Metford - Thornton
189 Thornton to Stockland Green Hills
192 South Maitland Loop (Monday to Saturday)
260 University of Newcastle – Wallsend – Maryland – Fletcher – Minmi
261 University of Newcastle – Wallsend – Maryland – Fletcher
262 Charlestown Square – Cardiff – Glendale – Edgeworth – Cameron Park
263 Charlestown Square – Cardiff – Glendale – Edgeworth – Cameron Park
266 Newcastle Interchange - Wallsend - Glendale - Edgeworth - West Wallsend - Seahampton (peak-hour service)
267 University of Newcastle – Wallsend – Cardiff – Glendale – Edgeworth – West Wallsend
268 Glendale – Edgeworth – Barnsley – Killingworth
269 Charlestown Square – Warners Bay – Speers Point – Woodrising – Toronto
270 University of Newcastle – Wallsend – Glendale – Woodrising – Toronto
271 Glendale – Teralba – Bolton Point – Fassifern – Toronto
273-Train Toronto – Blackalls Park – Fassifern
274 Toronto – Carey Bay – Kilaben Bay – Coal Point
275 Toronto – Rathmines – Arcadia Vale – Wangi Wangi – Morisset station
276 Toronto – Awaba – Rathmines – Arcadia Vale – Wangi Wangi
278 Morisset station – Bonnells Bay – Yarrawonga Park – Silverwater (Monday to Saturday)
279 Morisset station – Bonnells Bay – Yarrawonga Park – Sunshine (Monday to Saturday)
280 Morisset station – Avondale – Cooranbong (Weekdays only)
401 Singleton loop (Monday to Saturday)
402 Singleton – Darlington – Hunterview (weekdays)
403 Singleton – Singleton Heights (Monday to Saturday)
W1 (281) Wangi Wangi – Lake Haven (Fridays only)

Port Stephens Coaches
130 Newcastle Interchange – Newcastle Airport – Salamander Bay – Nelson Bay – Fingal Bay
131 Newcastle Interchange – Newcastle Airport – Salamander Bay – Nelson Bay – Shoal Bay (weekdays, express)
132 Soldiers Point – Salamander Bay – Vantage Estate – Nelson Bay – Little Beach
133 Soldiers Point – Salamander Bay – Nelson Bay – Little Beach
134 Soldiers Point – Anna Bay
135 Raymond Terrace – Salamander Bay – Nelson Bay (weekdays only)

Rover Coaches
160 Newcastle Interchange – University of Newcastle – Kurri Kurri – Cessnock (Monday to Saturday)
161 Cessnock Hospital and Vineyard Grove Hoppa (weekdays)
162 Cessnock – South Cessnock – Aberdare – Kearsley – Abernethy (Monday to Saturday)
163 Morisset station - Kurri Kurri – Cessnock (peak hour service)
164 Maitland – Gillieston Heights – Heddon Greta – Kurri Kurri – Cessnock (some services start/terminate at Stockland Green Hills)
165 Cessnock West Hoppa Service (weekdays)
166 Stockland Green Hills – Maitland – Saddlers Ridge – Gilleston Heights – Heddon Greta – Stanford Merthyr – Kurri Kurri (weekdays)
167 Nulkaba and Cessnock East Hoppa (weekdays)
168 Cessnock – Bellbird – Pelton -> Ellalong -> Paxton -> Millfield -> Greta Main -> Pelton – Bellbird – Cessnock
171 Kurri Kurri – Kurri Hospital – Weston (weekdays)
172 Kurri Kurri – Deakin Street, Kurri (one service on weekdays)

References

External links
Hunter Valley Buses timetables
Newcastle Buses, Timetables & routes
Port Stephens Coaches timetables

Bus transport in New South Wales
City of Lake Macquarie
Newcastle
Transport in the Hunter Region
Transport in Newcastle, New South Wales